This is a list of countries by total primary energy consumption and production.

 1 quadrillion BTU = 293 TW·h = 1.055 EJ
 1 quadrillion BTU/yr = 1.055 EJ/yr = 293 TW·h/yr = 33.433 GW

The numbers below are for the total energy consumption or production in a whole year, so should be multiplied by 33.433 to get the average value in GW in that year.

List

See also
 Electric energy consumption
 List of countries by electricity consumption
 List of countries by energy consumption per capita
 List of countries by electricity production
 List of countries by renewable electricity production

References 

Countries by energy consumption and production
Energy consumption
Energy production